The Church of St. Barbara (formerly Cathedral of St. Barbara and St. Paul ) is a Catholic church and the parish in Vitebsk a city in Belarus.

History

The church was built next to a cemetery in 1785. In the years 1884–1885 was rebuilt in Neo-Romanesque style by architect Victor Junosza-Piotrowski (including the construction of two towers). It was closed in the 1930s in the era of the Soviet Union, and during World War II was partially destroyed. In the years after the war in the temple he had various uses. 

In 1935 the church was closed by the Soviet authorities during its anti-religious program, and during World War II was partially destroyed. In the years after the war the temple was abandoned and gradually decayed.

In 1990 the cathedral was returned to the Catholic church, and between 1991 and 1998 was reconstructed. In 1993, he was consecrated by the cardinal Kazimierz Świątek. Between 1999 and 2011, the church served as the cathedral of the new diocese of Vitebsk. Today, the main cathedral is the Cathedral of Merciful Jesus in Vitebsk, consecrated in 2009. Later the follow church continued under repairs, which were funded with support from the Ministry of Culture and National Heritage of the Republic of Poland.

See also
 
Roman Catholicism in Belarus
St. Barbara

References

Roman Catholic cathedrals in Belarus
Buildings and structures in Vitebsk
Roman Catholic churches completed in 1785
18th-century Roman Catholic church buildings in Belarus